Haast Aerodrome,  is an aerodrome 1 mile (1.6 km) north of Haast in New Zealand.

Operational Information 
Circuit: RWY16 Right hand, RWY32 Left hand
FAL: Z Avgas swipecard
Commercial Activities not permitted

Sources 
NZAIP Volume 4 AD
New Zealand AIP (PDF)

Airports in New Zealand
Westland District
Transport buildings and structures in the West Coast, New Zealand